Jonesboro is a city in Union County, Illinois, United States. The population was 1,821 at the 2010 census, a decline from 1,853 in 2000. It is the county seat of Union County.  The city is known for being tied to its close neighbor Anna, together known as Anna-Jonesboro.

History
Jonesboro was the location of the third of the Lincoln-Douglas debates, on September 15, 1858. It was named for Doctor Jones, a pioneer settler. Nearby is the Trail of Tears State Forest.

Geography
Jonesboro is located at  (37.451126, -89.268566).

Demographics

As of the census of 2000, there were 1,853 people, 740 households, and 489 families residing in the city. The racial makeup of the city was 96.87% White, 0.65% African American, 0.59% Native American, 0.59% Asian, 0.76% from other races, and 0.54% from two or more races. Hispanic or Latino of any race were 1.19% of the population.

There were 740 households, out of which 31.5% had children under the age of 18 living with them, 51.2% were married couples living together, 11.6% had a female householder with no husband present, and 33.9% were non-families. 30.8% of all households were made up of individuals, and 17.6% had someone living alone who was 65 years of age or older. The average household size was 2.35 and the average family size was 2.95.

In the city, the population was spread out, with 24.1% under the age of 18, 8.0% from 18 to 24, 25.6% from 25 to 44, 23.3% from 45 to 64, and 19.0% who were 65 years of age or older. The median age was 40 years. For every 100 females, there were 89.9 males. For every 100 females age 18 and over, there were 83.2 males.

The median income for a household in the city was $30,441, and the median income for a family was $40,066. Males had a median income of $31,691 versus $24,464 for females. The per capita income for the city was $15,372. About 12.5% of families and 17.1% of the population were below the poverty line, including 17.9% of those under age 18 and 18.2% of those age 65 or over.

Education
The community is served by Jonesboro Elementary School District, which operates Jonesboro Elementary School (JES), and by Anna-Jonesboro Community High School in Anna.

References

External links
 Mr. Lincoln and Freedom: Lincoln-Douglas Debate in Jonesboro
1994 reenactment of Lincoln-Douglas Debate in Jonesboro televised by C-SPAN (Debate preview and Debate review)

Cities in Illinois
Cities in Union County, Illinois
County seats in Illinois